Christopher Tate or Chris Tate may refer to:

Chris Tate, Emmerdale character
Chris Tate (footballer)
Christopher G. Tate British biochemist
Christopher Tate (film editor), see 18th Genie Awards